Pterolophia adachii is a species of beetle in the family Cerambycidae. It was described by Masao Hayashi in 1983.

References

adachii
Beetles described in 1983